KYKA (104.9 FM) is a radio station serving the Anchorage, Alaska, area. The station is currently owned by the Educational Media Foundation.

KMVV was the eleventh station in the United States to adopt the Alan Burns-consulted MOViN' Rhythmic Adult Contemporary format. In November 2011, the station dropped the Rhythmic AC format and began stunting with Christmas music as "Rudolph Radio." The rhythmic AC format returned briefly on December 31, but then the station went off the air at midnight on January 1, 2012. KYKA was sold to Educational Media Foundation in December 2012, and the station adopted the Air1 Worship Music format. On March 11, 2013, KMVV changed their call letters to KYKA.

References

External links

Radio stations established in 2008
Air1 radio stations
2008 establishments in Alaska
Educational Media Foundation radio stations
YKA